Jaltepetongo may refer to:

San Francisco Jaltepetongo
San Pedro Jaltepetongo